Euseius reticulatus is a species of mite in the family Phytoseiidae.

References

reticulatus
Articles created by Qbugbot
Animals described in 2001